Victoria Elizabeth "Vicki" Chalmers (née Adams) (born 16 November 1989) is a Scottish curler who was the long time second for Eve Muirhead. Representing Scotland, they won the 2013 World Championships and the European Championships in 2011 and 2017. Representing Great Britain, they are the 2014 Olympic bronze medallists and finished fourth at the 2018 Winter Olympics.

Career
Chalmers was born in Edinburgh, Scotland and lives in Stranraer and Stirling. She has been a long-time member of the Muirhead rink, dating back to her junior career. With Muirhead, she won three gold medals at the World Junior Curling Championships, winning in 2008, 2009 and 2011. Chalmers, whilst at the University of the West of Scotland also won a gold medal at the 2011 Winter Universiade, playing second for Anna Sloan.

Chalmers stayed with the Muirhead rink after her junior career, except for the 2011 World Championships, when she played second for Sloan, finishing ninth. With the Muirhead rink, she won a gold medal at the 2011 European Championships in Moscow and the 2013 World Championships in Riga. The Scottish world champion team of Muirhead, Sloan, Chalmers and Claire Hamilton, were selected to represent Great Britain at the 2014 Winter Olympics, where they won the bronze medal.

Personal life

Chalmers is married to Andrew Chalmers and is the younger sister of curler, Kay Adams.

Like her longtime team-mate Eve Muirhead, she has coeliac disease

References

External links
 

1989 births
Living people
Scottish female curlers
British female curlers
Curlers from Stirling
Curlers from Edinburgh
World curling champions
Curlers at the 2014 Winter Olympics
Curlers at the 2018 Winter Olympics
Olympic curlers of Great Britain
Olympic bronze medallists for Great Britain
Olympic medalists in curling
Medalists at the 2014 Winter Olympics
European curling champions
Universiade medalists in curling
Continental Cup of Curling participants
Universiade gold medalists for Great Britain
Competitors at the 2011 Winter Universiade